Charles Carnegie, 4th Earl of Southesk (1661–1699) was a Scottish nobleman.

He inherited the earldom from Robert Carnegie, 3rd Earl of Southesk.

References

1661 births
1699 deaths
Earls of Southesk